Tex is a novel by S. E. Hinton, published in 1979. It was adapted as a film in 1982, which starred Matt Dillon. The book (like Rumble Fish and That Was Then, This Is Now) takes place in the same universe as Hinton's first book The Outsiders, but in a rural town called Garyville, Oklahoma, a fictional suburb of Tulsa.

Tex and his older brother Mason live by themselves while their father tours the rodeo circuit. Tex is blissfully happy with his life.  He likes simple things and taking it easy.  Mason, on the other hand, must step into a parental role when their father is gone for five months touring rodeos. Their mother is dead, so the two of them must fight to meet their financial obligations. The boys' lives are slowly being disrupted.

A film adaptation was released in 1982 by Disney, starring Matt Dillon, Jim Metzler, and Meg Tilly.

Plot  

The book opens with Tex McCormick, a 15-year-old who loves horses, and his brother Mason (Mace), living in a country home in a small town. Jamie is the girl next door. Their mother died years before, and their father goes off for months at a time leaving Mace, a high school senior and a star basketball player, and Tex at home.

Tex comes home to find the two brothers' horses sold. Tex considered his horse Negrito a friend, but Mace had to sell the horses to ensure they would have enough to eat through the winter. This action sets Tex against his brother for most of the book.

Living in the larger ranch house next door are the Collinses, who include Mace’s best friend Bob, Tex's best friend Johnny, and the younger sister whom Tex loves, Jamie. The children are forbidden to see Mason and Tex because the Collins patriarch, Cole, thinks they are a bad influence.

After a turn of events involving Tex and Mace's father, Tex runs away to the city with a family friend. He eventually learns that just living life and staying with his brother is the best thing for him.

Characters 
Tex McCormick: A fifteen-year-old boy. He loves horses, especially his horse Negrito. He is faithful to his father and his brother Mason. His best friend is Johnny Collins. 

Mason McCormick: A seventeen-year-old boy, and Pop's only biological child. He loves to fish, play basketball, and serves as a father figure to Tex. Tex says he looks like "a proud hawk." (p. 86)

Jamie Collins: Johnny's younger sister. She has a reputation for being mean, rarely going a week without being grounded or spanked. She uses threats and controlling behaviour to get her way. She is also flirty and believes passionately in women's rights.

Johnny Collins: Tex's best friend, from the richer Collins family. They get into trouble a lot, including with Johnny's bicycle when attempting to jump over a ditch.

Cole Collins: Father of Blackie, Charlie, Robert (Bob), Johnny, and Jamie Collins; married to Mona Collins. He is a strict and controlling father and spanks his children. When Johnny and Tex get drunk at Charlie's party, he blames Tex. After they get in trouble at school, Mason and Cole have an argument and Mason wins Cole's respect.

Bob Collins: Son of Cole. Brother of Jamie and Johnny. He is Mason's best friend and a good basketball player.

Pop McCormick: Father of Mason, whom he leaves in charge of Tex. Tex is the son of another man with whom his wife had an affair. They are now divorced. Pop stays away from his family a lot because of the rodeo tour, forcing him to stay away for five months.

Lem Peters: Immature friend of the family.

Mrs. Johnson: Tex's principal. Tex constantly gets in trouble with her, but she later promises him she will give him a job caring for horses.

Cathy Carlson: Tex's English teacher. She is revealed to be the sister of M&M from That Was Then, This is Now as she shows up at Mark's funeral.

The Hitchhiker: A dangerous drug dealer who has killed several other people before kidnapping Tex and Mason. Tex gets the attention of a police officer, and they shoot him dead. He is revealed to be Mark from That Was Then, This is Now after escaping from prison.

Mrs. Barnes: A typing teacher who works at Tex's school. She is played by Hinton in the film.

Kelly: A drug addict who acts up after a drug deal with Lem goes wrong. He holds Tex hostage until he escapes.

Negrito: Tex's horse until Mason sells him along with his horse Red. Tex tries to buy him back when Pop returns but fails. He was renamed as "Rowdy" in the film.

Clare McCormick: Tex's mother. She had a fight with Pop when Tex was 2 years old and walked out in the snow without her shoes on. Tex tried to stop her, but he couldn't reach the doorknob, and she later died of pneumonia.

Red: Mason's horse until he sells him along with Negrito. He was renamed as "Toyota" in the film. Although he didn't appear in the film, Toyota is also the name of Rowdy's actor.

1979 American novels
 Novels by S. E. Hinton
 American young adult novels
 American novels adapted into films
 Novels set in Oklahoma
 Culture of Tulsa, Oklahoma
 Novels set in Tulsa, Oklahoma